The National Council on Problem Gambling is the oldest organization on gambling issues. It was founded in 1972 by Msgr. Joseph A. Dunne and Dr. Robert Custer, among others. The Council established two principles:

 that the organization would be the advocate for problem gamblers and their families
 that it would maintain a neutral stance regarding the activity of gambling

The National Council's mission is to lead state and national stakeholders in the development of comprehensive policy and programs for all those affected by problem gambling with the purpose of serving as the national advocate for programs and services to assist problem gamblers and their families. It is neither for nor against legalized gambling.

The NCPG concentrates efforts on the national level, while the state affiliates work at the state and local level. NCPG's network of state affiliate, individual and corporate members includes leaders in prevention, education, treatment, enforcement, research, responsible gaming and recovery communities.

Keith Whyte became the executive director of the NCPG in October 1998. He oversees NCPG operations, with a specific focus on legislative advocacy, media relations, research, and public policy. Previously, he served as Director of Research for The American Gaming Association.

NCPG provides the opportunity to become a Counselor to stay up-to-date on everything about Problem Gambling, receive benefits of membership and help people. It requires training and certification. Special certifications are available for clergy/lay ministers, co-occurring disorder specialists, and video-gaming disorder. Certification standards established by the IGCCB  represent the current best practices in the field of disordered gambling and gaming treatment. The programs include:
 ICGC-I & ICGC-II: focused on gambling-specific training and clinical experience treating gamblers.
 International Co-Occurring Gambling Specialist Certificate (ICOGS): provides knowledge in the field of mental health treatment programs and counselors to address gambling problems in their clients.
 International Gaming Disorder Certificate (IGDC): focused on the best-practices and evidenced based approaches from professionals, that are emerging for the treatment of gaming and digital misuse, as well as the intersection with problem gambling and gambling disorders.
 Clergy Certification: helps with basic knowledge about gambling addiction, deep inside into treatment and recovery resources, to enhance the clergy person’s skills at recognizing at-risk, problematic and disordered gambling, and to provide information for the family affected by gambling addiction.

NCPG programs

A large portion of the NCPG funding comes from its membership program. NCPG membership is organized with 3 classes of members: state affiliate, corporate and individual.

The NCPG's major programs include the following:

 National Problem Gambling Helpline (1-800-522-4700): ensures local problem gambling help is just one call away anywhere in the US. 
 National Referral Resource: NCPG maintains the only nationwide online directories of certified counselors and inpatient/residential treatment facilities that offer specialized help in problem gambling, plus state-by-state referral resource listings.
 Problem Gambling Awareness Month: An annual grassroots campaign in March aiming to raise awareness about problem gambling and to educate the public and healthcare professionals about the availability of help and hope. In 2018, over 200 organizations participated in encouraging stakeholders to “Have the Conversation” about problem gambling and explore the many meanings of this theme by providing free press releases, screening tools, logo files, wearable messaging and other resources.  
 National Conference on Problem Gambling: The oldest and largest annual conference of its kind.  Approximately 500 regulators, legislators, counselors, researchers, industry executives and recovering gamblers attend each year.  Specific in-depth training is provided for all aspects of the field and top researchers present their latest findings.  Up to 30 hours of Continuing Education Units may be earned over the 2-day Pre-Conference Workshops and 2-day Main Conference.  The location changes each year, hosted by a state Affiliate and offering each region of the country easy access on a rotating basis. 
 Lottery Holiday Responsible Gaming Campaign: Created in partnership with the International Centre for Youth Gambling Problems and High-Risk Behaviors at McGill University, this campaign encourages adults to be aware of the risks of giving lottery products to minors as holiday gifts because those who start gambling at a young age are more likely to develop a problem later in life. NCPG partners with lottery organizations, providing free resources such as press release samples, social media guidelines and advertising materials, to launch their own independent campaigns. In 2017, 54 U.S. and international lotteries participated in the Campaign. Endorsed by the World Lottery Association (WLA).
 NASPL/NCPG Responsible Gambling Verification Program (RGV): In partnership with the North American Association of State and Provincial Lotteries, RGV is an independent review of lottery efforts to plan, implement and sustain their programs in RG in accordance with NCPG standards. Free to NASPL members.
 Internet Compliance Assessment Program (iCAP): Independent reviewers assess an internet gambling site's compliance with NCPG's Internet Responsible Gaming Standards, the first such standards developed for the U.S. market.
 Responsible Gaming Principles for Sports Gambling Legislation: Provides a basis for new regulations and legislation that may be enacted by individual states to allow sports betting. The principles will help protect individuals, gaming companies, and legislators by assisting the creation of reasonable efforts to prevent harm and provide treatment.
 Risk Education for Athletes Program (REAP): educates athletes of all ages about the personal and professional risks involved with gambling and how to be smart in risky situations.

References

External links
 Official site

Addiction organizations in the United States
Problem gambling organizations
Mental health organizations in Washington, D.C.